Intaqam is a 1969 Bollywood thriller film directed by R. K. Nayyar. It starred Sanjay Khan and Sadhana in the lead, supported by Ashok Kumar, Rehman, Jeevan, Rajendra Nath,  Helen and Anju Mahendru.

The film also features the iconic and first cabaret number sung by Lata Mangeshkar, "Aa Jaane Jaan", also a rarity through her career. The song was choreographed by P. L. Raj. It remains one of the most popular dance numbers of Helen's career. The music was composed by Laxmikant–Pyarelal, with lyrics by Rajinder Krishan and was popular with songs like "Hum Tumhare Liye, Tum Hamare Liye". Lata was nominated in the Filmfare Best Female Playback Singer category for her song "Kaise Rahun Chup", the only nomination for the film.

The film was an instant success at the box office and marked the return of actress Sadhana to films after her brief illness, and her husband directed the film.

It is a film adaptation of the 1912 play Within the Law (play), and there were prior film adaptations, including the American film Paid starring Joan Crawford.  Intaqam was remade into the Telugu film Pagabattina Paduchu (1971), starring Sharada (actress) and the Marathi film Naav Motha Lakshan Khota (1977)

Plot 
Reeta Mehra lives a poor lifestyle along with her sick mother. She works in a small setup, part of the franchise owned by Sohanlal. One day, her boss tries to send her to a businessman to entertain him, but she refuses. Because of that, he becomes angry and informs Sohanlal about her. Sohanlal manages to send her to one year of jail on charges of stealing jewelry from his shop.

By the time she comes out of jail, her mother has died and she pledges to take revenge on Sohanlal. On the other hand, Heeralal Mehra, who was escaped the arrest one year back with the help of Reeta, comes searching for her. They retrieve the box he had given her previously to safeguard. To Reeta's surprise it contains valuable jewels. He tells her his story and how he was cheated by Sohanlal. About twenty years back, having no other way, Heeralal got arrested saving Sohanlal and Sohanlal promises him that he would take care of Heeralal's family. But when Heeralal returns, he finds out that Sohanlal used the money just for himself and wouldn't know what happened to his family.

Now both Reeta and Heeralal form a pact to take revenge on Sohanlal. They use Rajpal, Sohanlal's only son for that purpose. Rajpal was an innocent, playful young man who falls easily for Reeta and deeply loves her. He marries her against his father's wishes. Later he learns that Reeta just wanted to use him, but he still loves her and asks her to forget everything. But Reeta and Heeralal disagree with him and publicly embarrass Sohanlal.

Eventually, people discuss Sohanlal because of the behavior of his daughter-in-law. Annoyed and embarrassed, Sohanlal arranges for Reeta's murder. Heeralal kills a criminal to save Reeta, but Rajpal thinks that Reeta killed him and surrenders himself as the murderer. Heeralal wouldn't tell the truth as he was waiting for Sohanlal to suffer. Reeta realizes her love for Rajpal and feels bad that things came to this extent. At that time, Sohanlal sees a picture of Reeta's mother and recognizes her as Heeralal's wife. Heeralal finally realises that Reeta is his daughter and surrenders himself to the police to save Rajpal. He is acquitted as he killed to save an innocent person's life, but receives a one-year sentence for his previous crimes. Everybody forgets the past and reconciles.

Cast
 Ashok Kumar as Heeralal Mehra
 Sanjay Khan as Rajpal (Raju)
 Sadhana as Reeta Mehra
 Rehman as Sohanlal
 Jeevan as Bankelal
 Helen as Rebecca
 Rajendra Nath as Pyarelal
 Anju Mahendru as Indu
 Asit Sen as Murlidhar Bansidhar
 Leela Chitnis as Mrs. Mehra
 Bhagwan Dada as Magician Pasha
 D. K. Sapru as Sohanlal's Lawyer
 Iftekhar as Police Inspector
 Dulari as Meena
 Jankidas as Heeralal's Employee

Music
The music of the film was composed by duo Laxmikant–Pyarelal with lyrics by Rajinder Krishan. The song "Aa Jaane Jaan" is one of a few cabaret numbers sung by Lata Mangeshkar. Also "Kaise Rahun Chup" earned Lata a filmfare nomination.

Influence
A cover version of the song "Aa Jaane Jaan" was featured in film, Hello Darling (2010) as an item number performed by Celina Jaitley.

References

External links
 
 

1960s thriller drama films
1969 films
1960s Hindi-language films
1960s crime thriller films
Films scored by Laxmikant–Pyarelal
Indian crime thriller films
Indian thriller drama films
Indian films based on plays
Hindi films remade in other languages
1969 drama films